Aleksa Đurasović (born 23 December 2002) is a Serbian footballer who plays as a midfielder for Spartak Subotica.

Career statistics

Club

Notes

References

2002 births
Living people
Serbian footballers
Serbia youth international footballers
Association football midfielders
Serbian SuperLiga players
FK Spartak Subotica players
Serbia under-21 international footballers